Jan Eli Andersen (born: 7 July 1966) is a sailor from Kerteminde, Denmark. who represented his country at the 1996 Summer Olympics in Savannah, United States as crew member in the Soling. With helmsman Stig Westergaard and fellow crew member Jens Bojsen-Møller they took the 6th place.

References

Living people
1966 births
Danish male sailors (sport)
Sailors at the 1996 Summer Olympics – Soling
Olympic sailors of Denmark
People from Kerteminde
Sportspeople from the Region of Southern Denmark